The 2014 Caribbean Premier League or for sponsorship reasons, Limacol CPL 2014 was the second season of the Caribbean Premier League, established by the West Indies Cricket Board. It began on 11 July and ended 16 August.

Squads

Teams and standings

League progression

Group stage

Fixtures

Knockout stage

Fixtures

Statistics

Most runs

Most wickets

References

External links
Tournament website on ESPN Cricinfo
Tournament Results on Cricinfo Upcric

Caribbean Premier League
Caribbean Premier League
Caribbean Premier League